, or Signed Swedish, is an obsolete manually coded form of Swedish that used signs of Swedish Sign Language for lexical words, supplemented by additional signs for grammatical words and inflectional endings.  It was developed in the 1970s in the hopes of making Swedish more accessible to the deaf, but was later abandoned for being slow and inefficient.  It was never a natural form of communication among deaf people.

External links
 Linus Glansholm (1993) Teckenspråket och de dövas situation, förr och nu

Swedish
Swedish language

Languages attested from the 1970s